Stuart Beckingham (born 26 May 1981 in Canberra) is an Australian figure skater.  He competed in men's singles, finishing third at the Australian Figure Skating Championships in 2003 and in 2004.  He then switched to pairs, teaming up with Emma Brien to win the 2005 national championship.

Competitive highlights

Men's singles

Pairs
(with Brien)

References

External links 
 
 

1981 births
Australian male single skaters
Living people
Sportspeople from Canberra
Competitors at the 2003 Winter Universiade